Do Tappeh District is in Khodabandeh County, Zanjan province, Iran. At the 2006 National Census, the region's population (as Howmeh Rural District in the Central District) was 19,186 in 4,073 households. The following census in 2011 counted 19,592 people in 5,364 households. At the latest census in 2016, there were 18,005 inhabitants in 5,256 households. In 2019, Khodabandeh District was established with the structure as shown in the following table.

References 

Khodabandeh County

Districts of Zanjan Province

Populated places in Zanjan Province

Populated places in Khodabandeh County

fa: بخش دوتپه